In military fortification, a contramure, or countermure, is a wall raised behind another, to supply its place when breached or destroyed.

The term was also used to refer to an outer wall, built around the wall of a city.

References

Fortification (architectural elements)